Chandler Lawson (born January 14, 1990) is an American beauty pageant titleholder from Tullahoma, Tennessee who was named Miss Tennessee 2012.

Biography
Lawson was born in Springfield, Missouri, but grew up in Tullahoma, Tennessee. She won the title of Miss Tennessee on June 23, 2012, when she received her crown from outgoing titleholder Erin Hatley. Lawson's platform is "5 Loaves 4 Kids," a non-profit program she founded in 2007 that provides meals for low income students. Her competition talent was a vocal rendition of Adele's “Turning Tables.” Lawson is a graduate of the University of Tennessee at Chattanooga with a degree in political science. Ms. Lawson is a graduate of the University of Tennessee College of Law and practices law in Chattanooga, Tennessee with the firm Bennett & DeCamp.

With only her doodles and 27 houseplants for her to talk to during the weekdays, Chandler's weekends are reserved for her and her friends.

References

External links

 
 

1990 births
Living people
American beauty pageant winners
Miss America 2013 delegates
Miss Tennessee winners
People from Tullahoma, Tennessee
University of Tennessee at Chattanooga alumni